Robert Angel invented the popular word guessing game Pictionary, which was self published in his tiny apartment in 1985. Since selling Pictionary, he has gone on to invent board games and products. Most of his life is spent drawing fruit and surfing the Pacific Angel currently lives in Seattle and is involved in multiple non profit companies.

Early life
Angel was born in Vancouver, Canada in 1958. He moved to the US at the age of 5 with his family, they lived in Spokane, WA. Angel attended Joel E Ferris High School, graduating in 1976. He then went on to Western Washington University and graduated in 1981 with a 2.9 GPA (he pioneered the idea of grades don't matter).

In 1982, he spent 5 months backpacking/hitchhiking throughout Europe. Upon his return to Spokane he moved in with 3 high school friends, which is when Pictionary was first conceived.

Career
In 1982, following his graduation from Western Washington University with a degree in Business Administration and while working as a waiter, Angel invented Pictionary. After work, Angel would gather with friends to play a version of the game that required each player to randomly locate a word in the dictionary, then sketch it for his teammates.

Two years later in 1984, Angel moved to Seattle and found his old notes on the game. After a few positive play tests with family he decided to go for it. Knowing the words for the game were critical, he went into his back yard and read the entire dictionary to compile the original word list. Two others then joined the company and they produced the first 1,000 games in Angel's apartment.

Angel and his business partners Terry Langston and Gary Everson first published Pictionary in 1985 through Angel Games, they managed to sell 6,000 copies in one year at $35 each.

They licensed the game in 1986 in a joint venture between The Games Gang and Western Publishing. Then in 1994, Hasbro took over publishing after acquiring the games business of Western Publishing.

In 2001, Pictionary was sold to Mattel. At that time they were in 60 countries and 45 languages, with 11 versions just in the US and a total of 32,000,000 games sold worldwide.
 
Angel developed another game adult board game called ThinkBlot. While the game was not as successful as Pictionary, it was still a hit for 2 years.

Angel has also worked as a producer, known for Finding Hillywood (2013) (aka Film Festival: Rwanda), the 1997 game show Pictionary, and It Snows All the Time in 2015.

Personal life
Angel has two children, Samantha and Benjamin. He currently lives in Seattle and is the Board President for Inspire Youth Project, an organization that provides emotional support programs and stability for children and teens affected by HIV/AIDS.

Published games
 Pictionary
 Pictionary: Hong Kong Golden Edition
 Pictionary: Party Edition
 Pictionary Junior
 ThinkBlot

References

Board game designers
1958 births
Living people
Western Washington University alumni